is a railway station on the Seishin-Yamate Line in Nishi-ku, Kobe, Japan. It is located in a residential area near the Kobe Industrial Park.

Layout

This station has one island platform with two tracks.

History
The station was opened on March 20, 1993, as an infill station along the Seishin-Yamate Line between Seishin-chūō and Ikawadani stations.

Railway stations in Hyōgo Prefecture
Stations of Kobe Municipal Subway
Railway stations in Japan opened in 1993